Delroy Pearson (born 11 April 1970) is an English singer and a member of the pop group Five Star. Pearson played his part in the group by writing songs and playing instruments on some of the band's hits. He scored success in the U.S. with the band Immature, now known as IMx whom he wrote and produced hits for.

Pearson was born in Islington, London, and now lives in California with his wife and children, still writing and producing for other artists. Delroy and Doris wrote their two minor hit singles for Epic Records in 1990, "Treat Me Like a Lady" and "Hot Love".

References

1970 births
Living people
20th-century Black British male singers
British contemporary R&B singers
Epic Records artists
Five Star members
English people of Jamaican descent
Musicians from London
People from Islington (district)